"The Reckless and the Brave" is a song by American rock band All Time Low from their fifth studio album Don't Panic.  A lyric video was published on YouTube on June 30, 2012. It was released on June 1, 2012 through Hopeless Records as the album's lead single.

References
Notes

Bibliography
 Wagner, Christian (June 1, 2012)."All Time Low - 06.01.12". AbsolutePunk. SpinMedia. Archived from the original on June 7, 2012. Retrieved June 15, 2017

All Time Low songs
2012 songs
Songs written by Alex Gaskarth
Hopeless Records singles